Susan Fuentes (1 November 1954 – 7 September 2013) was a Filipino singer known as the "Queen of Visayan Songs". She recorded and popularized Visayan classics such as Matud Nila (They Say in English; Sabi Nila in Filipino), Gimingaw Ako (I Feel Lonesome), Usahay (Sometimes in English; Minsan in Filipino), Rosas Pandan and Miss Kita Kung Christmas.

Early years
Fuentes was born as Susan Toyogon in 1954.

At age five, Fuentes was already joining amateur singing contests in Butuan. While still in high school at Agusan National High School, she was featured in the defunct Bisaya magazine for her singing talent and beauty.

After high school, she went to Manila to continue her singing career.

Career
She got her big break and her recording debut in 1977. As a singer, Fuentes’ sultry performance was noted for its lusty vocals and emotional styling. She was also known for her Latin-styled Visayan folk songs.

She gained crossover success in the Tagalog, Ilocano, Hiligaynon and Visayan music market  with the famed Awitong Bahandi and Mga Awiting Walang Kupas.

She eventually took a long hiatus from the music industry to raise her own children. During this period, Fuentes went through personal struggles with her life as she battled drug addiction and heavy smoking that would eventually lead to her partner taking her children away from her.

After over coming her personal struggles she returned to the industry in 2010 with the help of her long-time friend and singer Dulce. She performed with Pilita Corrales in Cebu, with Dulce in Bohol and made a guest appearance at Walang Tulugan with the Master Showman on June 19. These would be her last performances on stage. Her worsening health condition prompted Fuentes to be confined in the hospital.

On August 19, 2012, Dulce organized a fundraising event for her titled "Usahay … A Moment for Susan" which took place on August 28 at Zirkoh Morato in Quezon City. Among the performers were Manilyn Reynes, The CompanY, Gary Granada, Nonoy Zuñiga, Aiza Seguerra, Jose Mari Chan, Marco Sison, Jett Pangan, Isay Alvarez, and Frencheska Farr. The event was organized to help Fuentes pay for her medical bills. In December 2012, she was recognized by the JRG Halad Foundation as one of that year’s awardees for outstanding contributions to Cebuano music.

On March 23, 2013, she was featured in GMA Network's life story series Magpakailanman. Host Mel Tiangco interviewed her alongside her friend Dulce. It was her last televised appearance.

Personal life
Fuentes described her life during the 80's as "self-destructive" despite being wealthy.

She was in a relationship with a man named Darl who was already married and had children of his own. During the affair, they had two children; a daughter and a son. The couple lived together briefly and did not marry. After Fuentes became a drug addict, her partner decided to return to his other family and took her children with him. She became estranged from them for many years until 2012.

In 2002, she underwent kidney transplant after they were both damaged. She had to be confined in the Kidney Institute for three weeks, where she had 13 sessions of dialysis.

Death
During her final years, Fuentes had to be confined in the hospital due to her worsening health condition. She stopped performing on stage after 2010. In August 2012, she was interviewed by GMA News where she expressed hope of being able to live for another ten years. At her final televised appearance on Magpakailanman in March 2013, she told Mel Tiangco of how much she wanted to live so that she could see her children again and get to know them better following years of estrangement.

Fuentes died on September 7, 2013, after prolong confinement at the National Kidney and Transplant Institute. It was revealed that she had been in battle with colon cancer.

The JRG Halad Foundation hosted a tribute for Fuentes and the late Cebuano Maestro Mil Villareal, who also died in the same month, on September 30.

Discography

Albums
Ang Atong Pinangga (1976)
A New Feeling (Visayan Song Book) (1977)
Awitnong Bahandi (1977)
Halad Nako (Awitnong Bahandi Part 2) (1977)
Mananaygon (1978)
Yukbo sa Bisayanhong Awit w/ Pilita Corrales (1978)
Tango Uban Kang Susan (1980)
Mga Awiting Walang Kupas (1980)
Straight from the Heart (1982)
Miss Kita Kung Christmas (1990)

Singles
Miss Kita Kung Christmas (original released by The Lightnings Band in 1976; also Covered by Apo Hiking Society, also covered by Rico J. Puno, Sharon Cuneta, Jessa Zaragoza, Sarah Geromino, and Ronnie Lliang)
I Wonder What Will Happen (1976)
While I'm Around (1976)
Pinangga (Tagalog Song) (1976)
Himaya (Tagalog Song) (1976)
Sa Dilim Nitong Gabi (1976)
Sa Damgo Ko (w/ Harana Trio) (1976)
Tayo'y Magsimbang Gabi (1976)
Ang Aguinaldo Ko sa 'Yo (1976)
Kawang Lamang (1976)
Mahinumdum Ka Ra (adapt. SONG FOR ANNA) (1977)
Mga Hayop Sa Damo (Movie Theme) (1977)
Anong Pait (Movie Theme) (1977)
Ginikanan (1978)
Katahap (1978)
Dapa't Magsaya (with THE APO HIKING SOCIETY and PASSIONATA) (1978)
Nakapagtataka (1978; original by APO; also covered by Hajji Alejandro, Rachel Alejandro, and pinoy rock band Sponge Cola)
Siya (1978)
Singsing Nga Brilyante (1979)
Balili (1979)
Ay Pagkapait / Bisag Unsaon (1979)
Undo (1979)
Ayaw Pagpaila (1979)
Himayang Nahunlak (1979)
Tig! (1979)
Sigi Lang (adapt. I Will Survive) (1980)
Gugma Ko (1981)
Pagbati (1981)

See also
Butuan
Agusan del Norte

References

External links
http://www.philstar.com/entertainment/2013/09/08/1183961/farewell-queen-visayan-songs
http://entertainment.inquirer.net/111563/queen-of-visayan-songs-susan-fuentes-is-dead

1954 births
2013 deaths
20th-century Filipino women singers
Cebuano people
Filipino songwriters
People from Butuan
Traditional pop music singers
Visayan people